The 2016 All-Ireland Under-21 Hurling Championship was the 53rd staging of the All-Ireland inter-county championship since its establishment by the Gaelic Athletic Association in 1964. The championship began on 25 May 2016 and ended on 10 September 2016.

Limerick entered the championship as the defending champions. They were beaten by Tipperary in the Munster semi-final.

On 10 September 2016 Waterford won the championship following a 5-15 to 0-14 defeat of Galway in the All-Ireland final. This was their second All-Ireland title and their first in 24 championship seasons.

Format

Leinster, Munster and Ulster each organise a provincial under-21 championship. Connacht do not organise a provincial championship and are represented by Galway. The three provincial champions and Galway enter the All-Ireland semi-finals.

New trophy

In September 2016 the GAA established a new trophy named The James Nowlan Cup to be presented to the All-Ireland under-21 hurling champions.

The old trophy, the Cross of Cashel, was retired after the 2015  final having been introduced in 1967.

Provincial championships

Leinster Under-21 Hurling Championship

Quarter-finals

Semi-finals

Final

Munster Under-21 Hurling Championship

Quarter-final

Semi-finals

Final

Ulster Under-21 Hurling Championship

Semi-finals

Final

All-Ireland Under-21 Hurling Championship

Semi-finals

Final

Statistics

Top Scorer Overall

Top Scorer In A Single Game

References

Under-21
All-Ireland Under-21 Hurling Championship